is a passenger railway station in the city of Kimitsu, Chiba Prefecture, Japan, operated by the East Japan Railway Company (JR East).

Lines
Hirayama Station is a station on the Kururi Line, and is located 25.7 km from the terminus of the line at Kisarazu Station.

Station layout
The station consists of a single side platform serving bidirectional traffic. The platform is short, and can only handle trains with a length of three carriages or less. The station is unattended.

Platform

History
Hirayama Station was opened on March 25, 1936. It was closed from December 16, 1944 to April 1, 1947. The station was absorbed into the JR East network upon the privatization of the JNR on April 1, 1987.

Passenger statistics
In fiscal 2006, the station was used by an average of 48 passengers daily.

Surrounding area
 
 Obitsu River

See also
 List of railway stations in Japan

References

External links

   JR East Station information 

Kururi Line
Stations of East Japan Railway Company
Railway stations in Chiba Prefecture
Railway stations in Japan opened in 1936
Kimitsu